Geomicrobium  is a moderately halophilic and alkaliphilic genus of bacteria from the family of Bacillaceae with one known species (Geomicrobium halophilum). Geomicrobium halophilum has been isolated from garden soil in Japan.

References

Bacillaceae
Bacteria genera
Monotypic bacteria genera
Bacteria described in 2010